Muzaffarabad Assembly constituency was one of the 403 constituencies of the Uttar Pradesh Legislative Assembly, India. It was a part of the Saharanpur district and one of five assembly constituencies in the Saharanpur (Lok Sabha constituency).

Muzaffarabad Assembly constituency was demolished in 2008 as a result of the "Delimitation of Parliamentary and Assembly Constituencies Order, 2008" and renamed to Behat Assembly constituency.

Members of the Legislative Assembly

Election results

15th Vidhan Sabha: 2007 General Elections.

14th Vidhan Sabha: 2002 General Elections.

See also

Behat
Government of Uttar Pradesh
List of Vidhan Sabha constituencies of Uttar Pradesh
Uttar Pradesh
Uttar Pradesh Legislative Assembly

Notes

 Behat Assembly constituency came into existence in 2008. Prior to 2008, this constituency was served / represented by Sarsawa (Assembly constituency) which now ceases to exist.

References 

Former assembly constituencies of Uttar Pradesh
Politics of Saharanpur district
Constituencies disestablished in 2008
2008 disestablishments in India